The Behrendt Mountains is a group of mountains, 32 km (20 mi) long, aligned in the form of a horseshoe with the opening to the southwest, standing 11 km (7 mi) SW of Merrick Mountains at the base of the Antarctic Peninsula. Discovered and photographed from the air by the RARE, 1947–48, under Finn Ronne.

Named by US-ACAN for John C. Behrendt, traverse seismologist at Ellsworth Station in 1957. Behrendt led the Antarctic Peninsula Traverse party to these mountains, summer 1961–62, and carried out investigations in Marie Byrd Land and the Pensacola Mountains in 1963-64 and 1965–66.

See also
Mount Trimpi
Stanton Hills

References

External links
"IGY On the Ice", produced by Barbara Bogaev, Soundprint, aired August 25, 2011 on Maine Public Broadcasting. Radio documentary includes interviews with Behrendt, Tony Gowan, Phil Smith, and Charlie Bentley about the International Geophysical Year, under which umbrella the late 1950s Antarctic research took place.

Mountain ranges of Palmer Land